Hideo Den (田 英夫 Den Hideo, June 9, 1923 - November 13, 2009) was a Japanese news presenter, politician, and for 34 of the years between 1971 and 2007, a member of the House of Councillors for the Social Democratic Party. From 1978 to 1985, he was also the president of the Socialist Democratic Federation.

In 1947 he joined the Kyodo News company as a reporter. In 1962 he became a news presenter for TBS 's television news program.

He was the grandson of Den Kenjiro.

References

1923 births
2009 deaths
Members of the House of Councillors (Japan)
Social Democratic Party (Japan) politicians
Socialist Democratic Federation (Japan) politicians
University of Tokyo alumni